Amy Becher (born May 24, 1978) is an American curler from Omaha, Nebraska. In 2000, she won the United States Women's Curling Championship as vice-skip on Amy Wright's team. They went on to represent the United States at the 2000 World Women's Curling Championship.

Curling career
Becher competed at her first junior national championship in 1994, finishing last. She returned to junior nationals in 1995 and finished fourth.  Becher again improved her results at the 1996 Junior Nationals, winning the championship as skip of her own team. As Team USA at the 1996 World Junior Curling Championships they finished last with a 0–9 record. In 1997 Becher joined Risa O'Connell's team at third, defended her junior national title and improved her World Juniors result by finished in fourth place at the 1997 World Juniors. She returned to the World Junior Championships a third time in 1999, as alternate on Hope Schmitt's team.

Upon moving from juniors to women's curling, Becher joined Amy Wright's team at third and found success quickly. At her first Women's National Championship in 1999, Team Wright took the silver medal when they lost to Patti Lank in the final. They again faced Team Lank in the final of the 2000 Women's Championship, this time winning with a final score of 12–9. As national champions, Becher and Team Wright earned a spot at the 2000 World Women's Championship as well as an opportunity to compete at the 2001 United States Olympic Curling Trials. At World's, they finished in a three-way tie for sixth place with a 4–5 record. During the 2001 Olympic Trials Wright felt she was not playing good enough and stepped aside, allowing Becher to take over skipping duties. Despite the change in line-up, they finished in a three-way tie for last place with a 3–7 record.

Personal life
Becher's parents would bring her along to the curling club when she was young. She started curling competitively through the Ak-Sar-Ben Curling Club's juniors program.

Becher graduated from Minnesota State University, Mankato with a double major in chemistry and teaching.

Awards
 USA Curling Team of the Year 1997

Teams

References

External links
 

1978 births
Living people
American female curlers
Sportspeople from Omaha, Nebraska
American curling champions
21st-century American women